{{DISPLAYTITLE:Nu1 Boötis}}

Nu1 Boötis (ν1 Boötis) is an orange-hued star in the northern constellation of Boötes. It has an apparent visual magnitude of +5.02, which indicates the star is faintly visible to the naked eye. Based upon an annual parallax shift of 3.89 mas as seen from Earth, it is located roughly 840 light years distant from the Sun. At that distance, the visual magnitude of the star is diminished by an extinction of 0.13 due to interstellar dust.

The 'Ba0.4' suffix notation indicates this is a barium star, which means that the stellar atmosphere has been enhanced by s-process elements most likely provided by what is now an orbiting white dwarf companion. The giant component has  times the radius of the Sun. It is radiating 1,626 times the Sun's luminosity from its enlarged photosphere at an effective temperature of about 3,917 K.

References

External links
 
 

K-type giants
Bootis, Nu1
Boötes
Durchmusterung objects
Bootis, 52
138481
075973
5763
Barium stars